Eugnosta ochrolemma is a species of moth of the family Tortricidae. It is found in Mexico (Coahuila).

References

Moths described in 1986
Eugnosta